Courtney Clarkson (born 31 August 1991) is an Australian rules footballer who played for the Western Bulldogs in the AFL Women's competition. Clarkson was drafted by the Western Bulldogs with their 16th selection and 124th overall in the 2016 AFL Women's draft. She played six matches in her debut season and kicked one goal. She was delisted at the conclusion of the 2017 season.

References

External links 

1991 births
Living people
Western Bulldogs (AFLW) players
Australian rules footballers from Victoria (Australia)
Victorian Women's Football League players